Leucophytia bidentata is a species of small air-breathing land snail, a terrestrial pulmonate gastropod mollusk in the family Ellobiidae.

Description
For terms see gastropod shell.

The shell is 5–7 mm. high x 2–4 mm.wide. It is either white or horny to reddish brown and the shell has 6-7 very weakly convex whorls. The last whorl is 75% of the shell height and the apex is pointed. The aperture has a white layer at the parietal side, the parietalis (the spiral ridge on the parietal region projecting into the interior of the shell) is usually strong. The columellaris (or internal lip of the shell aperture) is moderately or indistinctly developed. There is no umbilicus.

Biology
This species of snail is semi-marine in habitat.

Distribution
This species is found on the coasts of the eastern Atlantic Ocean:
 Belgium
 France
 Great Britain
 Ireland
 The Netherlands
and the Mediterranean Sea:
 Turkey

Common name
The two-toothed white snail.

References

 Backeljau, T. (1986). Lijst van de recente mariene mollusken van België [List of the recent marine molluscs of Belgium]. Koninklijk Belgisch Instituut voor Natuurwetenschappen: Brussels, Belgium. 106 pp. 
 Welter-Schultes, F.W. (2012). European non-marine molluscs, a guide for species identification. Planet Poster Editions, Göttingen. A1-A3, 1–679, Q1-Q78. page(s): 72
 Rowson, B., Powell, H., Willing, M., Dobson, M. & Shaw, H. (2021). Freshwater Snails of Britain and Ireland. FSC Publications, Telford, UK.

External links
 Leucophytia bidentata at Animalbase taxonomy, short description, distribution, biology, status (threats), images 
 IUCN Red List
 Image of live animal
 Caruana-Gatto, A. (1890). Beschreibung einer neuen Alexia. Nachrichtsblatt der Deutschen Malakozoologischen Gesellschaft. 22: 210-211
 Pfeiffer, L. (1866). Ueber die Auriculaceen der Madera-Gruppe. Malakozoologische Blätter. Cassel (Theodor Fischer). 13(4): 142-144 [Oktober 1866; 13(5): 145-146]
 Küster, H. C. (1841-1845). Die Ohrschnecken (Auriculacea.). In Abbildungen nach der Natur mit Beschreibungen. In: Systematisches Conchylien-Cabinet von Martini und Chemnitz. Ersten Bandes, sechzehnte Abtheilung, erster Theil. (1) 16 (1, 25): 1-24, pls. 2 (1841); (1) 16 (1, 30): pl. 3 (1841); (1) 16 (1, 41): 23-30 (1843); (1) 16 (1, 42): pls. 4-6 (1843); (1) 16 (1, 49): 31-46, pls. 1, 7-9 (1844); (1) 16 (1, 53): 47-76, V-VI, pl. A (1845). Nürnberg (Bauer & Raspe). 
 Jeffreys, J. G. (1830). A synopsis of the testaceous pneumonobranchous Mollusca of Great Britain. Transactions of the Linnean Society of London. 16: 323-392
 Mittre H. (1841). Description de quelques coquilles nouvelles. Revue Zoologique par la Société Cuvierienne. 4: 65-70
 Montagu, G. (1808). Supplement to Testacea Britannica with Additional Plates. Woolmer, Exeter. v + 183 pp., pl. 17-30.
 Turton, W. (1819) A Conchological Dictionary of the British Islands. J. Booth, London, xxvii + 272 pp., 28 pls
  Pollock, L.W. (1998). A practical guide to the marine animals of northeastern North America. Rutgers University Press. New Brunswick, New Jersey & London. 367 pp.

Ellobiidae
Gastropods described in 1808